The Manned Space Flight Network (abbreviated MSFN, pronounced "misfin") was a set of tracking stations built to support the American Mercury, Gemini, Apollo, and Skylab space programs.

There were two other NASA space communication networks at the time, the Spacecraft Tracking and Data Acquisition Network (STADAN) for tracking satellites in low Earth orbit, and the Deep Space Network (DSN) for tracking more distant uncrewed missions. After the end of Skylab, the MSFN and STADAN were merged to form the Spaceflight Tracking and Data Network (STDN). STDN was in turn replaced by the satellite-based Tracking and Data Relay Satellite System (TDRSS) during the Space Shuttle program, being used .

Orbital versus deep space tracking 
Tracking vehicles in low Earth orbits (LEO) is quite different from tracking deep space missions. Deep space missions are visible for long periods of time from a large portion of the Earth's surface, and so require few stations (the DSN uses only three). These few stations, however, require the use of huge antennas and ultra-sensitive receivers to cope with the very distant, weak signals. Low Earth orbit missions, on the other hand, are only visible from a small fraction of the Earth's surface at a time, and the satellites move overhead quickly, which requires a large number of tracking stations, spread all over the world. The antennas required for LEO tracking and communication are not required to be as large as those used for deep space, but they must be able to track quickly.

These differing requirements led NASA to build a number of independent tracking networks, each optimized for its own mission. Prior to the mid-1980s, when the Tracking and Data Relay Satellite System (TDRSS) satellites became operational, NASA used several networks of ground-based antennas to track and communicate with Earth orbiting spacecraft. For the Mercury, Gemini, and Apollo missions, these were the primary means of communication, with the Deep Space Network (DSN) being assigned a supporting/backup role.

Mercury MSFN stations

The Manned Space Flight Network (MSFN) stations during Gordon Cooper's 1963 Mercury flight were:

Goldstone Deep Space Communications Complex (GDS), California
Coopers Island, Bermuda (BDA)
Maspalomas Station, Grand Canary Island (CAN)
Guaymas, Mexico (GYM)
Kano, Nigeria (KAN)
Kauai, Hawaii (HAW)
Canton Island, Republic of Kiribati (CTN)
Mercury Control Center (CNV), Cape Canaveral, Florida
White Sands, New Mexico (WHS)
Woomera Test Range, Australia (WOM)
Indian Ocean ship (IOS)
Pacific Ocean ship (USNS Wheeling)

The Bermuda FPS-16 radar was the only radar on the entire network that had track during the capsule's insertion into an orbital track, and thus was vital to the verification of proper orbit. The next station to have contact was the Canary Islands.

Cooper's flight was delayed for 24 hours due to a malfunction in the Bermuda FPS-16 radar's antenna data system. The radar set failed a CADFISS test, where all the stations in the network had to transmit information to NASA to ensure accurate information could be obtained. The failed part was replaced within 3 hours, but when the Capsule communicator asked for a realistic estimate, he was told 24 hours. The mission was immediately scrubbed for one day.

The network expanded for Project Gemini's longer flights which included rendezvous operations involving two spacecraft. A move toward increased computerization and decreased voice support for Gemini made a more centralized network possible with fewer primary stations and more secondary stations, although those major facilities were better equipped. Some Mercury stations were dropped; many were supplemented with new hardware.

The Apollo missions 
The Manned Space Flight Network (MSFN) during the Apollo era was also known as the Apollo Network. From a NASA technical report on the history of the MSFN:
The technical facts of life were these: the radars
of the Mercury and Gemini Networks obviously could not track
two spacecraft orbiting the Moon a quarter-million miles
away: neither could the small MSFN telemetry antennas hope
to pick out the telemetry and voice messages in the weak
signals arriving from the vicinity of the Moon. Translated
into network hardware terms, Apollo would require at least
the following changes in the MSFN:
A range and range rate tracking system, such as GRARR or the JPL range and range rate system, would have to be incorporated to accurately track the distant spacecraft while it was out of radar range.
Large dish antennas with high gains, such as the 26-m paraboloids employed in STADAN and the DSN, would have to be added to the MSFN to track and communicate at lunar distances.
Extant MSFN stations could not properly monitor the very critical mission phases when the spacecraft was inserted into its lunar trajectory and when it plunged into the narrow reentry corridor on the return trip. The result was that the MSFN had to be extended with ships, aircraft, and additional land sites.
Small paraboloidal antennas would have to be added at some MSFN sites to communicate with the Apollo spacecraft while it was still below the horizon for the 26-m dishes (below about 16,000 km) but beyond the range of the Gemini telemetry antennas.
The communication traffic during the Apollo missions would be several times that planned for Gemini. NASCOM lines would have to be augmented.

To meet these requirements, the MSFN used a combination of resources. A Jet Propulsion Laboratory (JPL) system called "Unified S-band", or USB, was selected for Apollo communications, which allowed tracking, ranging, telemetry, and voice to all use the same S band transmitter. Near-Earth tracking was provided by upgrading the same networks used for Mercury and Gemini. New large antennas for the lunar phase were constructed explicitly for the MSFN, with Deep Space Network (DSN) large antennas used for backup and critical mission phases.

DSN support during Apollo 
Although normally tasked with tracking uncrewed spacecraft, the Deep Space Network (DSN) also contributed to the communication and tracking of Apollo missions to the Moon, although primary responsibility remained with the Manned Space Flight Network (MSFN). The DSN designed the MSFN stations for lunar communication and provided a second antenna at each MSFN site (the MSFN sites were near the DSN sites for just this reason). Two antennas at each site were needed since the beam widths which the large antennas required were too small to encompass both the lunar orbiter and the lander at the same time. DSN also supplied some larger antennas as needed, in particular for television broadcasts from the Moon, and emergency communications such as Apollo 13.

From a NASA report describing how the DSN and MSFN cooperated for Apollo:

Another critical step in the
evolution of the Apollo Network came in 1965 with the advent
of the DSN Wing concept. Originally, the participation of
DSN 26-m antennas during an Apollo Mission was to be limited
to a backup role. This was one reason why the MSFN 26-m
sites were collocated with the DSN sites at Goldstone, Madrid,
and Canberra. However, the presence of two, well-separated
spacecraft during lunar operations stimulated the rethinking
of the tracking and communication problem. One thought was
to add a dual S-band RF system to each of the three 26-m
MSGN antennas, leaving the nearby DSN 26-m antennas still in
a backup role. Calculations showed, though, that a 26-m
antenna pattern centered on the landed Lunar Module would
suffer a 9-to-12 db loss at the lunar horizon, making tracking
and data acquisition of the orbiting Command Service
Module difficult, perhaps impossible. It made sense to
use both the MSFN and DSN antennas simultaneously during the
all-important lunar operations. JPL was naturally reluctant
to compromise the objectives of its many unmanned spacecraft
by turning three of its DSN stations over to the MSFN for
long periods. How could the goals of both Apollo and deep
space exploration be achieved without building a third 26-m
antenna at each of the three sites or undercutting planetary
science missions?
The solution came in early 1965 at a meeting at NASA
Headquarters, when Eberhardt Rechtin suggested what is now
known as the "wing concept". The wing approach involves
constructing a new section or "wing" to the main building at
each of the three involved DSN sites. The wing would include
a MSFN control room and the necessary interface equipment
to accomplish the following:
1. Permit tracking and two-way data transfer with either
spacecraft during lunar operations.
2. Permit tracking and two-way data transfer with the
combined spacecraft during the flight to the Moon
3. Provide backup for the collocated MSFN site passive
track (spacecraft to ground RF links) of the Apollo
spacecraft during trans-lunar and trans-earth phases.
With this arrangement, the DSN station could be quickly
switched from a deep-space mission to Apollo and back again.
GSFC personnel would operate the MSFN equipment completely
independently of DSN personnel. Deep space missions would
not be compromised nearly as much as if the entire station's
equipment and personnel were turned over to Apollo for several
weeks.

The details of this cooperation and operation are available in a two-volume technical report from JPL.

Current communication with Earth-orbiting spacecraft 
, three different NASA networks are used - the Deep Space Network (DSN), the Near Earth Network (NEN) and the Space Network/Tracking and Data Relay Satellite System (TDRSS). TDRSS uses a network of 10 geostationary communication satellites, and a single ground station at White Sands Test Facility.

After Apollo, the MSFN no longer needed the large antennas that had been used for lunar communication, which were eventually given over to the DSN. In 1985, the antenna at Honeysuckle Creek Tracking Station was moved to the Canberra Deep Space Communication Complex (CDSCC) DSN site, and the antenna at Fresnedillas was moved to the existing Robledo DSN location. The Goldstone Deep Space Communications Complex antenna is still in its original location.

See also 
 Merritt Island Spaceflight Tracking and Data Network station
 NASCOM

References

External links 

Manned Space Flight Network Performance Analysis for the GT-2 Mission - NASA - May 14, 1965 (PDF format)

Jet Propulsion Laboratory
NASA radio communications and spacecraft tracking facilities